William Rous (fl. 1390) of Paynestwychene Lane, Bath, Somerset, was an English politician, craftsman and tax collector.

Family
Rous was the son of Henry le Mareschal of Bath by his wife, Alice. He had a brother named John.

Career
He was a Member (MP) of the Parliament of England for Bath in January 1390. He was Mayor of Bath c. Sept. 1390 – 1391 and in 1392–93.

References

Year of birth missing
Year of death missing
English MPs January 1390
Mayors of Bath, Somerset